Lückhoff is a small merino sheep farming town in the Free State province of South Africa. It was established on the farm Koffiekuil in 1892 and named after a Dutch Reformed Church minister Reverend HJ Luckhoff.

Nowadays the bulk of the sheep found in this district are dorper sheep and not merino.  A small number of farmers also stock an indigenous sheep breed known as the damara.

The town is located 82 km north-west of Philippolis and 56 km west of Fauresmith. It was established in 1892 on the farm Koffiekuil. Probably named after Heinrich Jacob Luckhoff (1842-1943), Minister of the Dutch Reformed Church in Fauresmith at that time.

References

External links
 

Populated places in the Letsemeng Local Municipality
Karoo
Populated places established in 1892